Liverpool Cemetery is a historic cemetery located at Liverpool, Onondaga County, New York. It was established about 1846, and remains an active burial ground containing approximately 3,600 burials.  It is notable for the O’Neill family mausoleum, a large granite and marble early-20th century Neoclassical Revival building.

It was listed on the National Register of Historic Places in 2015.

Gallery

References

External links
 

Cemeteries on the National Register of Historic Places in New York (state)
1846 establishments in New York (state)
Neoclassical architecture in New York (state)
Buildings and structures in Onondaga County, New York
National Register of Historic Places in Onondaga County, New York